Gölbağı is a village in the Çelikhan District, Adıyaman Province, Turkey. The village is populated by Kurds of the Reşwan tribe and had a population of 198 in 2021.

The hamlets of Koyunucular and Uzuntaş are attached to the village.

References

Villages in Çelikhan District
Kurdish settlements in Adıyaman Province